Oriental Pearl may refer to:

MS Oriental Pearl, a cruise ship
Oriental Pearl Tower, a building in Shanghai, China
Shanghai Oriental Pearl Media, Chinese company

See also
 Pearl of the Orient (disambiguation)